Kevin Anthony Thornton (born 9 July 1986, in Drogheda) is a retired Irish footballer who played as a midfielder. He started his career at Coventry City, and has played for the likes of Brighton and Hove Albion and Coventry Sphinx

Playing career

Coventry City
A promising midfielder and product of the Sky Blues' Academy, Thornton was given a squad number for the first time in the 2005–06 season, following a productive pre-season in which he was included on the trips to Ibiza and his native Ireland. He made his debut on 20 September 2005, in a League Cup 1–0 defeat at Selhurst Park, replacing Isaac Osbourne on 83 minutes. He made sixteen Championship appearances later in the season, putting in a string of impressive displays in March and April. A fans' favourite due to his exciting style of play, Thornton scored his first goal for the club on 26 August 2006 against Hull City, but an ankle injury marred what seemed destined to be a successful season, limiting him to just 13 appearances. The Irishman penned a new two-year extension to his contract in May 2007, keeping him at the club until summer 2010. In 2007–08 he was limited to twenty appearances and continued to be used mainly as a substitute. He had a good run at the end of the season under new manager Chris Coleman.

Brighton & Hove Albion (Loan)
In September 2008, Thornton signed a six-week loan deal at League One team Brighton & Hove Albion. Following a six-week extension on the loan, he had played fifteen games for the Seagulls before returning to the Ricoh Arena.

Coventry Sphinx
After leaving Coventry City on 2 July 2009, Thornton joined Coventry Sphinx of the Midland Football Alliance and made two appearances and scored once in a short spell.

Boyne Rovers
On 1 September 2009, Thornton re-signed with his former school boy club Boyne Rovers FC. Boyne Rovers senior side operate in the fifth Tier of Irish amateur soccer. Convinced by legendary Rovers manager Declan Kierans that his time there would be a stepping stone to bigger things Thornton played 12 times for Rovers and scored the winning goal in a 4–3 win over bitter local rivals Drogheda Town.

Nuneaton Town
On 2 December 2009 he joined Nuneaton Town on a non-contract deal, playing football part-time whilst also touring the West Midlands with his indie three-piece band.

Northampton Town
On 8 January 2010 he joined Football League Two outfit Northampton Town on a short term contract during his time at Northampton Town, he made 24 Starts and 21 appearances.

Return to Nuneaton Town
As of 27 September he has signed a one-year contract with his former club Nuneaton Town. In his second spell at the club Thornton made just two appearances due to injury. He left Nuneaton Town shortly after.

Wrexham
Thornton had trials with a number of Football League and Non League clubs and on 3 July 2012, he joined Welsh club Wrexham on trial with view to a permanent deal for the new season. After six months on trial Thornton signed for Wrexham on non-contract terms. Thornton made his debut in a 5–0 win in an FA Trophy match against Sutton United which Thornton scored the fifth goal in. He then made his league debut in a 1–0 victory over Barrow FC, a game in which Thornton came off the bench to score the winner. He then made his first league start for the club on 2 March, against Alfreton Town FC, he continued his fine run of goals by opening the scoring, and was later greeted with a standing ovation when he was substituted. Kevin scored his fourth goal for Wrexham in his fourth league game for the club, against Ebbsfleet United, which was his fourth in four. The Irishman's most important goal came at Wembley Stadium in March 2013, It was in the FA Trophy Final and Wrexham were a goal down to Grimsby Town, and skipper Dean Keates was fouled in the Grimsby box, this resulted in a penalty for Wrexham in the 82nd minute, Thornton stepped up to take it and equalised, this took the game to extra-time and penalties, Thornton was substituted before the shoot-out which Wrexham won to lift the trophy. On 11 March 2014, Thornton joined Conference National side Tamworth on loan until the end of the season.

Tamworth
Following his release by Wrexham, Thornton rejoined Tamworth on the 9 June 2014. Released by Tamworth at the end of the 2014–15 season, Thornton briefly joined Barwell F.C. before following the former Tamworth manager Dale Belford to Rugby Town for whom he scored a penalty on debut in a 3–1 win at Carlton Town.

Coventry United

Following a short spell at Rugby Town in 2015–16, Thornton joined Coventry United of the Midlands League Premier for the season 2016–17.

Boyne Harps FC
Following his release from Coventry United, Thornton again returned home to Ireland after a short spell teaching yoga in Cape Verdi. He trained with current NEFL Champions Boyne Harps through the winter months and done enough to convince manager Wayne Wright to sign him on a short term 12-month contract. After 2 months awaiting clearance from the FA, Thornton made his long-awaited debut for Harps in a sold-out game against local rivals Millmount Celtic. Thornton scored 1 and assisted 2 as he made an immediate impact with the club endearing himself to the home fans in the process. Thornton went on to make 11 appearances for Harps scoring 3 goals, assisting 7 and receiving one red card in an ill-tempered clash with title challengers Duleek. After a frank discussion with manager Wayne Wright about his struggles with alcoholism, Thornton went into self exile in the remote seaside village of Clogherhead where he chose to live off the land and face his demons head-on.
Harps and Thornton parted ways in June with Thornton returning to the UK to further his career.

Racing Club Warwick
On 13 June 2019, Thornton joined Racing Club Warwick.

Return to Coventry United
In April 2020, Thornton re-joined Coventry United.

Career statistics

Career honours
Wrexham
 FA Trophy 2012–13

Personal life
Thornton is the younger brother of former Sunderland and Leyton Orient player Sean Thornton.

References

External links

1986 births
Living people
People from Drogheda
Association footballers from County Louth
Association football midfielders
Republic of Ireland association footballers
Republic of Ireland under-21 international footballers
Expatriate footballers in England
Coventry City F.C. players
Brighton & Hove Albion F.C. players
Coventry Sphinx F.C. players
Nuneaton Borough F.C. players
Northampton Town F.C. players
Wrexham A.F.C. players
Tamworth F.C. players
English Football League players
National League (English football) players
Belvedere F.C. players
Hinckley A.F.C. players
Barwell F.C. players
Rugby Town F.C. players
Racing Club Warwick F.C. players
Leinster Senior League (association football) players
Republic of Ireland expatriate association footballers